The 24th IBU Open European Championships were held in Duszniki-Zdrój, Poland from January 25 to January 29, 2017.

There were total of 8 competitions held: Single Mixed Relay, Relay Mixed, Sprint Women, Sprint Men, Pursuit Women, Pursuit Men, Individual Women and Individual Men.

Schedule of events 
The schedule of the event stands below. All times in CET.

Results

Men's

Women's

Mixed

Medal table

References

2017
International sports competitions hosted by Poland
2017 in biathlon
2017 in Polish sport
January 2017 sports events in Europe
Biathlon competitions in Poland